Sangram Durga is a land fort situated at Chakan, Pune, Maharashtra, India.
Original area of fort was 65 acres, currently only 5.5 acres.

The Fort was attacked by Mughal general, Shaista Khan with force of 20,000 men with artillery on 23 June 1660.
At that time, the fort was guarded by Killedar (fortress commander) Firangoji Narsala (age 70 at time) with force of 320 Mavalas (soldiers).

See also

List of forts in Maharashtra

References

Buildings and structures of the Maratha Empire
Forts in Pune district